This is a list of electoral division results for the 2016 Australian federal election in the state of New South Wales.

Overall results

Liberal to Labor: Barton, Dobell, Eden-Monaro, Lindsay, Macarthur, Macquarie, Paterson

Results by division

Banks

Barton

Bennelong

Berowra

Blaxland

Bradfield

Calare

Chifley

Cook

Cowper

Cunningham

Dobell

Eden-Monaro

Farrer

Fowler

Gilmore

Grayndler

Greenway

Hughes

Hume

Hunter

Kingsford Smith

Lindsay

Lyne

Macarthur

Mackellar

Macquarie

McMahon

Mitchell

New England

Newcastle

North Sydney

Page

Parkes

Parramatta

Paterson

Reid

Richmond

Riverina

Robertson

Shortland

Sydney

Warringah

Watson

Wentworth

Werriwa

Whitlam

References

New South Wales 2016